Hearts of Iron is a grand strategy video game developed by Paradox Development Studio and published by Strategy First. Based on the Europa Engine, it was originally released in 2002 for Microsoft Windows. A Mac OS version was released by Virtual Programming the following year. In 2004, Atari, SA published Hearts of Iron: Platinum, an updated version that sought to improve several aspects of the game.

Hearts of Iron allows the player to take control of a nation in the world and guide it through World War II and the years immediately before and after it. Hearts of Iron is the first game in the eponymous series of grand strategy wargames. Three additional games have been released in the series: Hearts of Iron II, Hearts of Iron III, and Hearts of Iron IV.

Gameplay 
Players play as a nation in the world in the years leading up to, during, and immediately after World War II. There are three main alliances in the game: the Allies, the Axis, and the Comintern. Nations in the game can attempt to join these alliances. Players can also control their nation's economy, government, and military. The game ends when there is only one alliance left or when the end date is reached; the winning alliance is determined through a victory point system, with points being given to alliances that control key regions or cities.

Sequels 
A sequel to Hearts of Iron, Hearts of Iron II, was released in 2005. Two spin-offs were created for Hearts of Iron II: Darkest Hour: A Hearts of Iron Game and Arsenal of Democracy: A Hearts of Iron Game. The third game in the series, Hearts of Iron III was released on August 7, 2009. Hearts of Iron – The Card Game was released as a free-to-play, browser-based collectible card game on October 3, 2011. East vs. West – A Hearts of Iron Game was scheduled to release in 2014, but was canceled. Hearts of Iron IV, the fourth main installment in the series, was released on June 6, 2016.

Reception 

The game received "average" reviews according to the review aggregation website Metacritic. Tom Chick of Computer Games Magazine summarized Hearts of Iron as "an ambitious mess, a noble mess, certainly a well-intentioned mess, but ultimately a mess nonetheless".

Hearts of Iron: Platinum 

Hearts of Iron: Platinum was released in 2004 with the intention of improving several elements of the original game. According to Metacritic, Hearts of Iron: Platinum received slightly more favorable reviews than the original Hearts of Iron.

Ban in China 
The game was banned in the People's Republic of China because of the game's depiction of Taiwan under Japanese control and Tibet, Sinkiang, and Manchuria as independent nations (historically, Manchuria was a Japanese puppet state and Taiwan was under Japanese control for most of the time period depicted in the game).

See also 

Chronology of grand strategy video games 
List of Paradox Interactive games 
List of World War II video games

References

Further reading

External links 
 Official series website
 
 

2002 video games
Computer wargames
Classic Mac OS games
MacOS games
Paradox Interactive games
Real-time strategy video games
Censored video games
Windows games
World War II grand strategy computer games
Video games developed in Sweden
Strategy First games
Works banned in China
Multiplayer and single-player video games